The commelinids are a group of 29 interrelated families of flowering plants, named for one of the four included orders, Commelinales. They account for most of the global agricultural output; the grass family alone contains the major cereal grains (including rice, wheat, and maize or corn), along with forage grasses, sugar cane, and bamboo. The palm, banana, ginger, pineapple and sedge families are also in the commelinid clade.

Traits common to most commelinids include partially fluorescent cell walls, starchy seeds and an extra layer of epidermal wax. Like other monocots, they usually have a single embryonic leaf (cotyledon) in their seeds, leaves with parallel veins, scattered vascular systems, flowers with parts in threes or multiples of three, and roots that can develop in more than one place along the stems. These plants are found worldwide, even in mainland Antarctica; two species of grass are the only vascular plants found there. 

Legend

Commelinid families

See also

Notes

Citations 
For POWO citations that name additional databases, after reaching the page for the family, click on the "General information" tab.

References
   See the licence.
 
 
 
  
 
  See Kew's Terms of Use for license.
 
 
 

Systematic
Taxonomic lists (families)
Gardening lists
Lists of plants
Commelinids